Argemma maesseni, commonly known as Maessen's forest sylph, is a species of butterfly in the family Hesperiidae. It is found in Ivory Coast and Ghana (the Ashanti Region). The habitat consists of forests.

References

Butterflies described in 1971
Hesperiinae